Kinneret is the English transliteration for Kineret, the Hebrew name of the Sea of Galilee, the largest freshwater lake in Israel.

Other meanings of Kinneret and Kineret include:

Places
 Camp Kinneret, a summer camp of Canadian Young Judaea
 Kinneret (archaeological site), biblical city which gave the Sea of Galilee its Hebrew name; now Tell el-'Oreimeh or Tel Kinrot on the northwestern coast of the lake
 Kinneret College, college south of the Sea of Galilee
 Kinneret Farm, experimental training farm (1908-1949), now museum
 Kinneret Subdistrict, Israel
 Kvutzat Kinneret, kibbutz southwest of the Sea of Galilee
 Moshavat Kinneret, village (moshava) southwest of the Sea of Galilee

People
 Kineret (singer), an Orthodox Jewish recording artist
 Kinneret Shiryon (born 1955), Reform rabbi, the first female rabbi in Israel

Other
 Kineret (medication), brand name of anakinra; no direct relation to the lake
 Kinneret, Israeli song based on Rachel Bluwstein's poem "Perhaps" ("Ve'Ulai")
 Kinneret bream or Kinneret bleak, Acanthobrama terraesanctae, fish endemic to the Sea of Galilee and a second lake in Syria
 Kinneret Zmora-Bitan Dvir, publishing company, Israel
 Operation Kinneret, another name of the Israeli military Operation Olive Leaves

See also